Jumeirah Golf Estates is a luxury residential golf community that is located along E 311 road (United Arab Emirates), in Dubai, United Arab Emirates. It is rated among the top 10 lifestyle estates in the world.

Jumeirah Golf Estates consists of over 1,500 villas, town houses and apartments arranged into more than a dozen distinct communities, set alongside two Greg Norman-designed 18-hole golf courses, each with a different environmentally themed name – Fire and Earth. The Earth Course is the host venue for the DP World Tour Championship, Dubai, the season ending tournament on the European Tour.

Jumeirah Golf Estates is served by its own metro station on the Route 2020 section of Red Line on the Dubai Metro, serving the Expo 2020 site to the south.

References

External links

Golf clubs and courses in the United Arab Emirates
Sports venues in Dubai